"Modigliani (Lost in Your Eyes)" is the fourth single released by the American synthpop band Book of Love. The song was included on the band's eponymous debut album Book of Love in 1986. "Modigliani (Lost in Your Eyes)", was released as a single in early 1987, making it the fourth and final single release from the album. The B-side to the single is a remixed version of "Modigliani" by Omar Santana, titled "Mo'dub'iani".

Background
"Modigliani (Lost in Your Eyes)" is an ode to Italian painter Amedeo Modigliani. The track was penned by Jade Lee, Susan Ottaviano, and Ted Ottaviano (not related despite having the same unusual last name), who had all been art school students and were inspired by the Italian painter's paintings and history.  

The cover of the single featured one of Modigliani's famous paintings of his mistress Jeanne Hébuterne, along with Ted's short bio: "Born in Livorno Italy on July 12, 1884, Amedeo Modigliani received little recognition for his paintings and sculpture during his lifetime. He had only a single one-man show, which instead of success brought scandal because of several nude paintings. He died of Tuberculosis at the age of 36. The day after his death, his mistress Jeanne Hébuterne, pregnant with his child, leaped from a fifth story window, killing both herself and the child. Within two years ironically, Modigliani's work began to be recognized and his reputation was soon established." 

The last line of the song's lyrics are in Italian: "Amedeo Amedeo, gli occhi tuoi, mi anno fatto innamorare", which roughly translates to "Amadeo Amadeo, I fell in love with you when I saw your eyes."

Artwork
For the back sleeve of the 12-inch single, Susan Ottaviano made drawings of each member of the band in the style of Modigliani. Similar large portrait drawings of the band were later used as large stage props behind the band on their Lullaby Tour in 1989.

Reception
The song was a dance club hit, peaking at No. 17 on the Billboard Hot Dance Club Play chart, becoming as popular as New Order and Depeche Mode singles in clubs at its peak.

In popular culture
The four-minute "Requiem Mass" remixed version of "Modigliani (Lost in Your Eyes)" was featured in an episode of Miami Vice on November 6, 1987, and both the original single and "Requiem Mass" remix were used in the 1987 film Planes, Trains and Automobiles.

Track listings

1987 7-inch single
Side A:
"Modigliani (Lost in Your Eyes)" – 3:53

Side B:
"Mo'dub'iani" – 5:09

1987 12-inch maxi-single
Side A: 
"Modigliani (Lost in Your Eyes)" (I Dream of Jeanne Mix) – 7:42
"Modigliani" (Requiem Mass) – 4:01
Side B:
"Mo'dub'iani" – 5:09
"Modigliani (Lost in Your Eyes)" (7-inch Re-mix) – 3:53

Personnel 
Book of Love
Jade Lee – keyboards, percussion
Susan Ottaviano – lead vocals
Ted Ottaviano – keyboards, backing vocals
Lauren Roselli – keyboards

Technical
Ted Ottaviano – re-mix, additional production, cover short bio on Modigliani 
Steve Peck – engineer
Omar Santana – editing ("Mo'dub'iani")
Herb Powers – mastering
Ivan Ivan – producer
Nick Egan – design
Susan Ottaviano – drawings of Book of Love 
Amedeo Modigliani – cover portrait of Jeanne Hébuterne

Charts

Official versions

" * " denotes that version is available as digital download

References

External links 
  Popdose.com's White Label Friday: Book of Love's "Modigliani (Lost In Your Eyes)" by David Medsker

Book of Love (band) songs
1987 singles
1986 songs
Sire Records singles
Amedeo Modigliani
Songs about painters
Cultural depictions of Italian men